The sulcular epithelium is that epithelium which lines the gingival sulcus.  It is apically bounded by the junctional epithelium and meets the epithelium of the oral cavity at the height of the free gingival margin.  The sulcular epithelium is nonkeratinized.

References

Dental anatomy